Ishim is a town in the south of Tyumen Oblast, Russia. Population:  It was previously known as Korkina Sloboda (until 1782).

History
It was founded in 1670 as the village of Korkina Sloboda. In 1721, by the order of Tsar Peter the Great the village gained the right to establish Nikolskaya Trade Fair which rapidly became one of the most important trade fairs in Siberia. This trade fair took place twice a year on the Saint Nicholas day (19 December and 22 May) until 1919. In 1782, by the order of Empress Catherine the Great, Korkina Sloboda was renamed Ishim and was granted town status. In 1918, Ishim became the administrative center of Ishimsky Uyezd. In 1921-1922 Ishim was the center of the West Siberian rebellion. In 1984, the city began a sister city relationship with Grand Forks, North Dakota in the United States. This relationship terminated in the late 1990s due to economic turmoil in Ishim. In 2017 Ishim began a sister relationship with Surovikino, Volgograd Oblast in Russia.

Administrative and municipal status
Within the framework of administrative divisions, Ishim serves as the administrative center of Ishimsky District, even though it is not a part of it. As an administrative division, it is incorporated separately as the Town of Ishim—an administrative unit with the status equal to that of the districts. As a municipal division, the Town of Ishim is incorporated as Ishim Urban Okrug.

Transport
Ishim is currently designated the eastern terminus of European route E22, a road route crossing Russia, Latvia, Sweden, Germany, the Netherlands, and the United Kingdom.

Climate

Notable people
Pyotr Pavlovich Yershov, writer
Nikolai Nikitin, engineer
Nikolay Anikin, Olympic cross country skier
Boris Shakhlin, a Soviet gymnast, the 1960 Olympic all-around champion and the 1958 all-around World Champion

References

Notes

Sources

External links

Official website of Ishim 
Ishim Business Directory 

Cities and towns in Tyumen Oblast
Ishimsky Uyezd
Populated places established in 1670